Robert Bertelli, better known as Bob Bert, is an American rock drummer.

Biography
Based in Hoboken, New Jersey, Bert initially came to prominence as drummer for the experimental rock band Sonic Youth during the early to mid-1980s.   Bert played on the Sonic Youth  releases Confusion Is Sex, Sonic Death, and Bad Moon Rising.  After Bad Moon Rising, Bert quit the group.

Bert contributed during the last half of the 1980s as percussionist for noise band Pussy Galore. He was a member of Action Swingers in the early 1990s.

In the early 1990s, Bert drummed for the Chrome Cranks (which also included Peter Aaron on vocals; Jerry Teel on bass; and William Weber on stun guitar).

After the dissolution of the Cranks, Bert joined forces with guitarist Kid Congo, guitarist Jack Martin, bassist/vocalist Jerry Teel and organist Barry London in the rootsy New York City band Knoxville Girls.

Throughout, Bert managed to release a handful of recordings by his percussive/concussive vehicle Bewitched. Releases by Bewitched include the Chocolate Frenzy 12" EP; some albums, including Harshing My Mellow on No. 6 Records; and the "Hey White Homie" 7" on Sub Pop. Bewitched toured with S.Y. and STP (short-lived NYC all-female foxcore band which included PG guitarist Julie Cafritz) during the summer of 1990, the year Goo was released.

During the late 1990s, Bert and his wife, artist Linda Wolfe, began publishing BBGun, a zine that primarily covers punk rock.

In 1998, Bert contributed the liner notes and interviewed Suicide for the reissue of the band's eponymous second album.

Bert played with Five Dollar Priest as well as with the International Shades, which features ex-Live Skull guitarist Mark C. and former Pier Platters shop assistant-turned-keyboardist Dorien Garry among others.

In 2011 Thick Syrup Records released the compilation cd Bewitched - Bob Bert Presents: The Worst Poetry Of 1986 - 1993, featuring all tracks Bob Bert recorded with Bewitched. The label also released the last album of the re-united Chrome Cranks featuring Bert on drums.

Bert is now playing with Retrovirus (Lydia Lunch, Weasel Walter, Tim Dahl), who have released studio and live albums, and also with Wolfmanhattan Project with Kid Congo Powers (The Gun Club, The Cramps, Nick Cave & the Bad Seeds, Knoxville Girls, Pink Monkey Birds) and Mick Collins (The Gories, The Dirtbombs).

In 2019, Bert released I'm Just the Drummer: My Time Behind Sonic Youth, Pussy Galore, Chrome Cranks & BB Gun Magazine, a book compiling his photographs and interviews he did with artists he collaborated with or that influenced him.

Discography

With Sonic Youth

 Confusion is Sex, 1982
 Kill Yr Idols, 1983
 Bad Moon Rising, 1984
 Sonic Death, 1984
 Death Valley 69, 1984

With Lee Ranaldo
 Between the Times and the Tides, 2012

Bewitched
 Chocolate Frenzy 12" EP
 Brain Eraser, No. 6 Records
 Harshing My Mellow, No. 6 Records
 "Hey White Homie" 7" Sub Pop.
 Bob Bert Presents: The Worst Poetry of 1986-1993, Thick Syrup Records 2011

Chrome Cranks
 Dead Cool, CD Crypt, 1995
 Love In Exile, CD PCP, 1996
 Oily Cranks, CD Atavistic Records, 1997
 Diabolical Boogie: Singles, Demos & Rarities (1992 B.C.- 1998 A.D.) CD, Atavistic Records, 2006
 Ain't No Lies In Blood CD, Thick Syrup Records 2011

With Lydia Lunch Retrovirus
Retrovirus, Recorded live at the Knitting Factory, Brooklin, NY, Nov 15, 2012 (CD / Widowspeak, 2013)
Urge to Kill (CD / Widowspeak / Rustblade / Brava, 2015)
Live in Zurich (CD / Widowspeak, 2016)

With Wolfmanhattan Project 

 Smells Like You, (7", In The Red Recordings, 2015)
 Blue Gene Stew, (CD/Album, In the Red Recordings, 2019)

References

Further reading
Browne, David. Goodbye 20th Century: A Biography of Sonic Youth. Da Capo Press, 2008. . pg. 81 ff.

Sonic Youth members
Pussy Galore (band) members
American rock drummers
Noise rock musicians
Living people
Musicians from Hoboken, New Jersey
Place of birth missing (living people)
1955 births